Four ships of the United States Navy have been named Asheville after Asheville, North Carolina.

 , was a gunboat that served in the Caribbean and off the China coast, and was sunk by Japanese forces early in World War II.
 , an Asheville-class patrol frigate, served on the East Coast doing escort duties during World War II.
 , a high-speed gunboat, served in the Vietnam War.
 , is a Los Angeles-class submarine, currently in service.

Sources

United States Navy ship names